Kristijan Kahlina (born 24 July 1992) is a Croatian professional footballer who plays as a goalkeeper for Charlotte FC in Major League Soccer.

Club career
Kahlina played for NK Vinogradar in 2011–12 and 2012–13.

In 2019, he was named captain for HNK Gorica.

Kahlina signed with Major League Soccer expansion team Charlotte FC in December 2021, ahead of their inaugural season.

International career
Kahlina played with the Croatia national under-19 team.

Honours

Club

Ludogorets
 Bulgarian First League (1):  2020–21
 Bulgarian Supercup: 2021

References 

1992 births
Living people
Footballers from Zagreb
Association football goalkeepers
Croatian footballers
Croatia youth international footballers
NK Vinogradar players
NK Lučko players
FC Koper players
HNK Gorica players
PFC Ludogorets Razgrad players
Charlotte FC players
Croatian Football League players
First Professional Football League (Bulgaria) players
Major League Soccer players
Croatian expatriate footballers
Expatriate footballers in Slovenia
Croatian expatriate sportspeople in Slovenia
Expatriate footballers in Bulgaria
Croatian expatriate sportspeople in Bulgaria
Croatian expatriate sportspeople in the United States
Expatriate soccer players in the United States